Metrophanes Kritopoulos, sometimes Critopoulos, Critopoulus, Kritopulus (– 30 May 1639) was a Greek monk and theologian who served as Greek Patriarch of Alexandria between 1636 and 1639.

Biography
Metrophanes Kritopoulos was a Greek born in Veria, Macedonia in 1589. Originally a monk on Mount Athos, he was a close associate of Cyril Lucaris. He studied at the University of Oxford in England (1617–24, funded by James I) and in Germany. He travelled to Europe and mingled with the greatest scholars and theologians of his day.  He made Orthodoxy known in the West and was particularly concerned with the problem of unifying the Orthodox Church with the churches of Western Europe. He taught Greek in Vienna (1627–30). After a period as bishop of Memphis in Egypt, he was elected patriarch of Alexandria on 1636, where he put together an important library.

He died in Wallachia in 1639.

See also
List of Macedonians (Greek)

References
General

Specific

External links
List of Great Macedonians (15th-19th century)

1589 births
1639 deaths
17th-century people from the Ottoman Empire
People from Veria
Eastern Orthodox Christians from Greece
17th-century Greek clergy
17th-century Greek Patriarchs of Alexandria
17th-century Greek people
17th-century Greek writers
17th-century Greek educators
17th-century Greek philosophers
People associated with Mount Athos